Grivel Srl is a company that produces tools and equipment for alpinism, climbing, and outdoor activities. It exports to 26 countries. All the personal safety products, ice axes, crampons, pitons, helmets are produced in Italy. The company has been certified GS TUF since 1992, ISO 9001 since 1996, ISO 1400 since 2004.

History
Founded in 1818 in Courmayeur, Italy. It is the oldest manufacturer of tools for alpinism in existence. Grivel is the surname of the original founders who succeeded each other for generations.
The company was sold in 1982 to a group of enthusiasts headed by Giochino Gobbi.
Today the company has offices in Courmayeur and Verrayes in the Aosta Valley, in Vivaro in Friuli and Chamonix in France.

External links
 Official Site

Notes and references

Climbing and mountaineering equipment companies
Sporting goods manufacturers of Italy
Italian brands
Manufacturing companies established in 1818
Italian companies established in 1818
Companies based in Aosta Valley
Courmayeur